Cobra Starship was an American pop punk band, formed by Gabe Saporta in 2005. Other members are guitarist Ryland Blackinton, bassist Alex Suarez, drummer Nate Novarro, and keytarist Victoria Asher, all of whom provide backing vocals. The group released their debut album, While the City Sleeps, We Rule the Streets in 2006. "Snakes on a Plane (Bring It)", is the debut single of dance rock band Cobra Starship from the soundtrack album Snakes on a Plane: The Album.

Gabe's friendship with Pete Wentz earned them an opening slot on the Fall Out Boy tour. ¡Viva La Cobra!, their second album was released in late 2007. They played MTV Spring Break, Bamboozle East, West, in London, Tokyo and Canada. In January 2009, they started producing their third album, released in August, Hot Mess. The lead single for this album, "Good Girls Go Bad", charted at number two in New Zealand. In late August, 2011, the band released their fourth studio album, Night Shades. The lead single, "You Make Me Feel..." featuring rapper Sabi, debuted at number one in New Zealand.

Their discography consists of four studio albums, thirteen singles, and seventeen music videos.

Studio albums

Extended plays

Singles

As lead artist

Other appearances

Music videos

As lead artist

Notes

References

Discographies of American artists
Pop punk group discographies